Nigel Ashford (born 1952) is a British-born, U.S.-based academic and author, primarily in the field of politics. He serves as the Senior Programs Officer at the Institute for Humane Studies.

Career
Ashford was a Professor of Politics at Staffordshire University, where he was also a Jean Monnet Scholar. He served as the Director the Principles of a Free Society Project at the Jarl Hjalmarson Foundation in Sweden. He was a recipient of the International Anthony Fisher Trust Prize.

Ashford serves as the Senior Programs Officer at the Institute for Humane Studies. He also served on the Advisory Council of the Democracy Institute.

Bibliography
 US Politics Today (1999)
 Public Policy and the Impact of the New Right (1994)
 A Dictionary of Conservative and Libertarian Thought (1991)

References

Living people
Academics of Staffordshire University
British political scientists
1952 births